The 5th Infantry Brigade was a regular infantry brigade of the British Army that was in existence since before the First World War, except for a short break in the late 1970s. It was an Airborne Brigade from the early 1980s until amalgamating with 24th Airmobile Brigade, in 1999, to form 16 Air Assault Brigade.

History
During the Boer War, the 5th Infantry Brigade, known as the Irish Brigade, fought in the Battle of Colenso under Major General Arthur Fitzroy Hart.  It consisted of the 1st Royal Dublin Fusiliers, 1st Inniskilling Fusiliers, 1st Connaught Rangers, and the 1st Border Regiment.

Following the end of the Boer war in 1902 the army was restructured, and a 3rd Infantry division was established permanently at Bordon as part of the 1st Army Corps, comprising the 5th and 6th Infantry Brigades.

World Wars 
The brigade was part of the 2nd Division during the First World War and was one of the first British units to be sent overseas on the outbreak of war. The brigade became part of the British Expeditionary Force and saw action on the Western Front in the Battle of Mons and the subsequent Great Retreat and at the First Battle of Ypres, which saw the old Regular Army virtually destroyed.

During the Second World War, the 5th Brigade was again part of the 2nd Infantry Division and was sent to France in 1939 shortly after the outbreak of war, where it joined the British Expeditionary Force. It served on the Franco-Belgian border until May 1940, when it was evacuated at Dunkirk after fighting in the short but fierce battles of France and Belgium in which the German Army nearly cut off the entire BEF from the French Army. With the division, the brigade remained in Britain on home defence until 10 April 1942, when it was shipped out to India to fight the Imperial Japanese Army after a series of disasters suffered by the British and Indian troops stationed there. The 5th Brigade served with the 2nd Infantry Division in the Burma Campaign under General Slim's British Fourteenth Army and fought in the Battle of Kohima, which managed to help turn the tide of the campaign in the Far East.

Post 1945
Following the war, it was part of the British Commonwealth Occupation Force in Japan, and then the British Army of the Rhine until 1964, when the Brigade Group was released to bolster the strategic reserve. It arrived in Borneo in October 1965 to take control of the Mid West Sector during the Indonesia–Malaysia confrontation, but by 1968 it was back in the United Kingdom as part of the 3rd Infantry Division. It did a tour in Northern Ireland during the early part of the Troubles.

In 1979-80 Headquarters 8 Field Force was heavily involved in directing the Commonwealth Monitoring Force during the transition to the newly independent state of Zimbabwe.

In the early 1980s, the Field Force concept was dropped in favour of traditional Brigades; 5th Infantry Brigade was reformed at Aldershot in January 1982 by the redesignation of 8th Field Force. The Brigade consisted of the former elements of the Parachute Contingency Force (PCF) from 6 Field Force (which became the 1st Infantry Brigade), at the time 2 PARA, together with a second Parachute Battalion from 8 Field Force (3 PARA).

Falklands War 
The Brigade was sent to the Falklands in 1982 as the follow-on force to 3rd Commando Brigade. Having had its two Parachute Regiment battalions withdrawn to reinforce 3 Commando Brigade, it was hurriedly reconstituted with two Guards battalions pulled from Public duties in London and No. 63 Squadron RAF Regiment, (based at RAF Gütersloh, Germany) initially to provide additional Short Range Air Defence (SHORAD) of land forces landing at San Carlos Water.

5th Airborne Brigade 
Following the Falklands War, it was converted into 5th Airborne Brigade by it Commander, Brigadier Tony Jeapes. The brigade consisted of two battalions of the Parachute Regiment, a Gurkha battalion, and a Territorial Army infantry battalion, together with additional parachute support elements and a small parachute deployable Brigade HQ. The 7th Parachute Regiment RHA returned from Germany and was converted to an airborne unit and attached to the brigade. A Brigade Logistic Battalion was formed. On 1 September 1999, the brigade merged with 24 Airmobile Brigade to produce 16 Air Assault Brigade.

Structure

First World War Order of Battle 
The brigade was part of 2nd Division. The brigade commanded the following units in the First World War:
 2nd Battalion, Worcestershire Regiment (transferred to 33rd Division on 15 December 1915)
 2nd Battalion, Oxfordshire and Buckinghamshire Light Infantry
 2nd Battalion, Highland Light Infantry
 2nd Battalion, Connaught Rangers (transferred to 3rd (Lahore) Division on 26 November 1914)
 1/9th Battalion, (Glasgow Highlanders), Highland Light Infantry (November 1914 to January 1916)
 2nd Battalion, Royal Inniskilling Fusiliers (January to July 1915)
 1st Battalion, Queen's (Royal West Surrey Regiment) (July to December 1915)* 1/7th Battalion, King's (Liverpool Regiment) (September to November 1915)* 17th (Service) Battalion (Empire), Royal Fusiliers (City of London Regiment) (December 1915 to February 1918)
 24th (Service) Battalion (2nd Sportsman's), Royal Fusiliers (City of London Regiment) (from December 1915)
 5th Machine Gun Company (from 1 January 1916 to 4 March 1918")
 5th Trench Mortar Battery (from March 1916")

Second World War Order of Battle
The brigade commanded the following units in the Second World War:
 2nd Battalion, Royal Warwickshire Regiment (until 5 February 1940)
 2nd Battalion, Dorsetshire Regiment
 1st Battalion, Queen's Own Cameron Highlanders
 7th Battalion, Worcestershire Regiment (from 5 February 1940)

Falklands War Order of Battle 
The final order of battle included:
 205 signal squadron HQ, Royal Signals
 1st Battalion, Welsh Guards
 2nd Battalion, Scots Guards
 1st Battalion, 7th Duke of Edinburgh's Own Gurkha Rifles
 4th Regiment, Royal Artillery
 1 troop of the Blues and Royals
 63 Squadron RAF Regiment (SHORAD)

5th Airborne Brigade 
The 5th Airborne Brigade Order of Battle was as follows:

 HQ 5 Airborne Brigade
 89 Abn Intelligence Section, Intelligence Corps
 No.1 Air Force Liaison Section
 2 x Parachute Battalions
 1 x Infantry Battalion (2nd Battalion The Wessex Regiment (Volunteers). Note that while this was a Territorial Army battalion, it was a resident unit of the brigade, not part of the Territorial Army enhancement described below).
 1 x Gurkha Battalion
 1 x Armoured Recce Regiment Life Guards/ The Blues & Royals
 4th Field Regiment Royal Artillery (1977 - 1983)
 7th Parachute Regiment Royal Horse Artillery (1984 - TBA) 
 Royal Pioneer Corps
 36 Engineer Regiment Royal Engineers
 9 Para Squadron RE
 20 Sqn RE
 50 Field Construction Sqn RE
 61 Field Support Sqn RE
 216 (Parachute) Signal Sqn Royal Signals
 Det 224 Signal Sqn Royal Signals
 658 Aviation Sqn Army Air Corps
 23 Parachute Field Ambulance Royal Army Medical Corps
 160 Provost Company Royal Military Police
 613 Tactical Air Control Party (Parachute) RAF Regt
 614 Tactical Air Control Party (Parachute) RAF Regt
Logistic Battalion 
 63 Abn Squadron Royal Corps of Transport/ Royal Logistic Corps
 82 Abn Ordnance Company Royal Army Ordnance Corps/ Royal Logistic Corps
 10 Abn Workshop Royal Electrical & Mechanical Engineers

Commanders 
Notable commanders included:
 1938-1941 Brigadier Gerald Gartlan
 1941-1942 Brigadier J.R.T. Aldous
 1942-1944 Brigadier V.F.S. Hawkins
 1944-1945 Brigadier M.M. Alston-Roberts-West
 1982-1983 Brigadier Tony Wilson
 1983-1985 Brigadier Tony Jeapes

Notes

References

Sources

External links

Airborne infantry brigades of the United Kingdom
Military units and formations of the United Kingdom in the Falklands War
Military units and formations of the Second Boer War
Infantry brigades of the British Army in World War I
Infantry brigades of the British Army in World War II
1999 disestablishments in the United Kingdom
Military units and formations in Burma in World War II
Military units and formations established in 1908
Military units and formations disestablished in 1918
Military units and formations established in 1935
Military units and formations disestablished in 1976
Military units and formations established in 1982
Military units and formations disestablished in 1999
British Commonwealth Occupation Force